Freimut Stein (June 16, 1924 – September 15, 1986) was a German figure skater. Stein was a single male skater and the German champion from 1952 to 1954.  In 1953, he won the bronze medal at the European championships. He represented the club 1. FC Nürnberg section Roll- und Eissport. From 1950 to 1954, he was also the German champion in roller skating. He was the roller skate world champion in 1951 and 1952. After his skating career, he became a figure skating judge. In 1964, his book Eiskunstlaufen: eine Einführung (Figure skating: an introduction) was published. Dr. Freimut Stein continued writing books about various subjects.

Competitive highlights in figure skating

References
 
 ISU result lists

1924 births
1986 deaths
German male single skaters
Olympic figure skaters of Germany
Figure skaters at the 1952 Winter Olympics
European Figure Skating Championships medalists
Sportspeople from Nuremberg